Shokhruz Norkhonov (Uzbek Cyrillic: Шохруз Норхонов; born 13 April 1993) is an Uzbekistani footballer who plays as a forward for Sogdiana Jizzakh.

Honours
Sogdiana
Uzbekistan Super League second pease: 2021 
Obod
Uzbekistan Pro League winner: 2015 
Bunyodkor
Uzbekistan Cup runner-up: 2017

References

External links

1993 births
Living people
Uzbekistani footballers
Uzbekistan international footballers
Association football midfielders
FC Bunyodkor players
Uzbekistan Super League players